Blue Springs is an unincorporated community in Milton, Ontario, Canada.

Blue Springs Creek flows south of the settlement.

References

Neighbourhoods in Milton, Ontario